Gomelsky Uyezd (Гомельский уезд) was one of the subdivisions of the Mogilev Governorate of the Russian Empire. It was situated in the southern part of the governorate. Its administrative centre was Gomel.

Demographics
At the time of the Russian Empire Census of 1897, Gomelsky Uyezd had a population of 224,723. Of these, 74.1% spoke Belarusian, 14.4% Yiddish, 9.7% Russian, 1.0% Polish, 0.5% Ukrainian, 0.1% German and 0.1% Romani as their native language.

References

 
Uezds of Mogilev Governorate
Mogilev Governorate